Donald Douglas Lamond Jr. (August 18, 1920 – December 23, 2003) was an American jazz drummer.

Biography
Born in Oklahoma City, Lamond attended the Peabody Conservatory in Baltimore in the early 1940s, and played with Sonny Dunham and Boyd Raeburn at the outset of his career. In 1944, he performed baritone saxophone and drums on Charlie Parker’s ‘’The Complete Savoy and Dial Studio Recordings 1944-1948’’ and he took over Dave Tough's spot in Woody Herman's big band First Herd in 1945, where he remained until the group disbanded at the end of 1946. In 1947, he briefly freelanced with musicians including Charlie Parker, and then returned to duty under Herman in his Second Herd, where he remained until its 1949 dissolution. In the 1950s and 1960s Lamond found work as a session musician, recording in a wide variety of styles. He performed and recorded with Stan Getz, Zoot Sims, Johnny Smith, Benny Goodman, Ruby Braff, the Sauter-Finegan Orchestra, Sonny Stitt, Johnny Guarnieri, Jack Teagarden, Quincy Jones, George Russell, Count Basie, Lee Wiley (where he performed drums and guitar on her 1956 album ‘’West of the Moon’’ and Bob Crosby among others. He recorded as a bandleader in 1962 with a tentet which included Doc Severinsen. Later in the 1960s he played with George Wein's Newport Festival band. In the 1970s, he worked with Red Norvo, Maxine Sullivan, and Bucky Pizzarelli, and also put together his own swing group late in the decade, which recorded in 1977 and 1982. He also recorded a quartet album in 1981 with his wife, Terry Lamond, singing.

He died in 2003 in Orlando, Florida, from a brain tumor, at age 83.

Discography 
According to The Jazz Discography, by Tom Lord, Lamond is listed on 549 recording sessions from 1943 to 1982.

As leader
Off Beat (Command, 1962, RS842SD)
Full album title, Off Beat Percussion starring Don Lamond and his Orchestra

As sideman
With Manny Albam
The Drum Suite (RCA Victor, 1956) with Ernie Wilkins
With Ruth Brown 
Late Date with Ruth Brown (Atlantic, 1959)
With Al Cohn
The Sax Section (Epic, 1956)
The Four Brothers... Together Again! (Vik, 1957) with Serge Chaloff, Zoot Sims and Herbie Steward
Son of Drum Suite (RCA Victor, 1960)
With Bobby Darin
Beyond the Sea (ATCO, 1958)
With Art Farmer
Baroque Sketches (Columbia, 1967)
With Stan Getz
Stan Getz Quartets (Prestige, 1949-50 [1955])
The Complete Roost Recordings (Blue Note, 1950–54 [1997])
With Harry James
Harry James and His Orchestra 1948–49 (Big Band Landmarks Vol. X & XI, 1969)
With Hank Jones
Gigi (Golden Crest, 1958)
With Quincy Jones
The Birth of a Band! (Mercury, 1959)
The Great Wide World of Quincy Jones (Mercury, 1959)
With Herbie Mann
Love and the Weather (Bethlehem, 1956) 
With Howard McGhee
Life Is Just a Bowl of Cherries (Bethlehem, 1956)
With Carmen McRae
Birds of a Feather (Decca, 1958)
Something to Swing About (Kapp, 1959)
With Chico O'Farrill
Nine Flags (Impulse!, 1966) 
With Don Elliott and Rusty Dedrick
Counterpoint for Six Valves (Riverside, 1955–56)
With George Russell 
Jazz in the Space Age (Decca, 1960)
With Nelson Riddle
 Phil Silvers and Swinging Brass (Columbia, 1957)
With Johnny Smith
Johnny Smith (Verve, 1967)
With Rex Stewart and Cootie Williams
Porgy & Bess Revisited (Warner Bros., 1959)
With Joe Wilder
The Pretty Sound (Columbia, 1959)
With Cootie Williams
Cootie Williams in Hi-Fi (RCA Victor, 1958)
With Charlie Parker
 Charlie Parker's New All Stars
 Howard McGhee (trumpet), Charlie Parker (alto sax), Wardell Gray (tenor sax), Dodo Marmarosa (piano), Barney Kessel (guitar), Red Callender (bass), Don Lamond (drums)
 Recorded in Hollywood, California, February 26, 1947
 Originally issued by Dial
 D1071-A: Relaxin' at Camarillo
 D1071-B: Relaxin' at Camarillo
 D1071-C: Relaxin' at Camarillo
 D1071-D: Relaxin' at Camarillo
 D1071-E: Relaxin' at Camarillo
 D1072-A: Cheers
 D1072-B: Cheers
 D1072-C: Cheers
 D1072-D: Cheers
 D1073-A: Carvin' the Bird
 D1073-B: Carvin' the Bird
 D1074-A: Stupendous
 D1074-B: Stupendous

 Charlie Parker With Strings
 Chris Griffin, Al Porcino, Bernie Privin (trumpets), Will Bradley, Bill Harris (trombones), unknown flute and oboe, Toots Mondello, Charlie Parker, Murray Williams (alto saxes), Hank Ross, Art Drellinger (tenor saxes), Stan Webb (bari sax), Lou Stein (piano), Verley Mills (harp), unknown strings, Art Ryerson (guitar), Bob Haggart (bass), Don Lamond (drums), Joe Lipman (arranger, conductor)
 Recorded in New York, January 22 or 23, 1952
 C675-2: Temptation
 C676-3: Lover
 C677-4: Autumn in New York
 C678-4: Stella by starlight

 Charlie Parker Quartet, Jerry Jerome Concert
 Charlie Parker (alto sax), Teddy Wilson (piano), Eddie Safranski (bass), Don Lamond (drums)
 Recorded in Concert at Loew's Kings Theatre, Brooklyn, March 24, 1952
 Cool blues

 Charlie Parker Big Band
 Jimmy Maxwell, Carl Poole, Al Porcino, Bernie Privin (trumpets), Bill Harris, Lou McGarity, Bart Varsalona (trombones), Charlie Parker, Harry Terrill, Murray Williams (alto saxes), Flip Phillips, Hank Ross (tenor saxes), Danny Bank (bari sax), Oscar Peterson (piano), Freddie Green (guitar), Ray Brown (bass), Don Lamond (drums), Joe Lipman (arranger, conductor)
 Recorded in New York, March 25, 1952
 C756-5: Night and day
 C757-4: Almost like being in love
 C758-1: I can't get started
 C759-5: What is this thing called love?

 Jerry Jerome Jazz Concert, Featuring Charlie Parker
 Bill Harris (trombone), Buddy DeFranco (clarinet), Charlie Parker (alto sax), Dick Cary (piano), Eddie Safranski (bass), Don Lamond (drums)
 Recorded in concert at Loew's Valencia Theatre, Jamaica, New York, March 25, 1952
 Ornithology

 Charlie Parker Tentet
 probably Charlie Walp (trumpet 2), Charlie Parker (alto sax), Earl Swope, Bob Swope (trombone 2), Zoot Sims (tenor sax 2), probably Bill Shanahan (piano), Charlie Byrd (guitar), Mert Oliver (bass), Don Lamond (drums) unknown (bongos)
 private recording Howard Theatre, Washington, D.C., October 17, 1952
 Scrapple from the apple
 Out of nowhere
 Now's the time (2)
 52nd Street theme (incomplete)
 Cool blues (2)

References
General references

Inline citations

External links
 Don Lamond recordings at the Discography of American Historical Recordings.

1920 births
2003 deaths
Musicians from Oklahoma City
American jazz drummers
Jazz musicians from Oklahoma
20th-century American drummers
American male drummers
20th-century American male musicians
American male jazz musicians